"Cousin Dupree" is the first single from Steely Dan's 2000 album Two Against Nature. The song's lyrics describe the sexual desires the titular Dupree has for his attractive cousin. In 2001, the song won a Grammy Award for Best Pop Performance by a Duo or Group with Vocal.

In July 2006, Steely Dan posted a humorous letter on their website saying that the title of Owen Wilson's film You, Me and Dupree was stolen from their song. The film is about a house guest who overstays his welcome; the song's title character is a slacker who is sleeping on his aunt's couch. Owen Wilson defended himself in similarly deadpan comic fashion, stating, "I have never heard the song 'Cousin Dupree' and I don't even know who this gentleman, Mr. Steely Dan, is. I hope this helps to clear things up and I can get back to concentrating on my new movie, 'HEY 19.'"

Personnel
Donald Fagen – Wurlitzer piano, lead vocals
Walter Becker – bass guitar, guitars
Leroy Clouden – drums
Jon Herington – rhythm guitar
Ted Baker – Rhodes piano
Carolyn Leonhart – backup vocals
Amy Helm – whistling

External links
Lyrics from Steely Dan website

References

2000 songs
Steely Dan songs
Songs written by Donald Fagen
Songs written by Walter Becker
Giant Records (Warner) singles